Kirkland is an unincorporated community in Williamson County, Tennessee.

References

Unincorporated communities in Williamson County, Tennessee
Unincorporated communities in Tennessee